In mathematics, the Al-Salam–Ismail polynomials are a family of orthogonal polynomials introduced by .

References

Orthogonal polynomials